Frontbench Team of Vince Cable may refer to:

First Frontbench Team of Vince Cable (2007)
Second Frontbench Team of Vince Cable (2017–19)